Anestia semiochrea, the marbled footman, is a moth of the subfamily Arctiinae first described by Arthur Gardiner Butler in 1886. It is found in Australian Capital Territory, Queensland and New South Wales.

The female has only vestigial wings (it is brachypterous).

The larvae feed on lichen.

References

Lithosiini
Moths described in 1886
Moths of Australia